April 20 - Eastern Orthodox liturgical calendar - April 22

All fixed commemorations below are observed on May 4 by Eastern Orthodox Churches on the Old Calendar.

For April 21, Orthodox Churches on the Old Calendar commemorate the Saints listed on April 8.

Saints

 Martyrs Theodore of Perge in Pamphylia, his mother Philippa, and Dioscorus, Socrates, and Dionysius (c. 138-161) (see also: April 19 - Greek)
 Martyr Alexandra the Empress, wife of Diocletian, and those with her (303): (see also: April 23)
 Martyrs Isaacius, Apollo, and Codratus, of Nicomedia.
 Hieromartyrs Januarius, Bishop of Benevento, and his companions (c. 305)
 Faustus, Proclus, and Sosius, Deacons; 
 Desiderius, Reader; and 
 Gantiol, Eutychius, and Acutius, laymen, at Pozzuoli.
 Saint Maximianus, Archbishop of Constantinople (434) 
 Venerable Anastasius Sinaita, Abbot of the Monastery of St. Catherine at Sinai (c. 700) (see also: April 20 - Slavic)
 Martyr Karol (Charles)

Pre-Schism Western saints

 Saint Cyprian, Bishop of Brescia (582)
 Saint Beuno, Abbot, of Clynnog Fawr, Wales (642)
 Saint Maelruba of Apur Crossan (Maelrubius, Maolrubha), Ireland (722) 
 Saint Frodulphus (Frou), a monk at St Martin's in Autun (c. 750)

Post-Schism Orthodox saints

 Saint Theodore the Philosopher of Kamske, martyred by Mongols (1323) 
 Venerable Jacob (Jakov, James), Abbot of Stromynsk Monastery, Radonezh (1392)
 Saint Alexis, Priest of, Bortsurmany, Nizhny Novgorod (1848)

New martyrs and confessors

 New Hieromartyr John Prigorovsky, Priest (1918)
 Saint Nicholas Pisarevsky, Confessor, Priest (1933)
 New Hieromartyr Alexis Protopopov, Priest (1938)
 New Hieromartyr Protopresbyter Basil Martysz of Teratyn, Chelm and Podlasie, Poland (1945) (see also: May 4)

Other commemorations

 Synaxis of The Mozdok Icon of the Mother of God (Mozdokskaya) (1768)
 Uncovering of the relics (1999) of St. Theodore, Abbot of Sanaxar Monastery (1791)
 Repose of Schemamonk Nicetas of Valaam Monastery (1907)  
 Repose of Elder Dometian of Tula (1908) 
 Repose of Hieroschemamonk Antipas II of Valaam Monastery (1912) 
 Repose of Nun Stefanida of Kosovo, Serbia.

Icon gallery

Notes

References

Sources
 April 21 / May 4. Orthodox Calendar (pravoslavie.ru).
 May 4 / April 21. Holy Trinity Russian Orthodox Church (A parish of the Patriarchate of Moscow).
 April 21. OCA - The Lives of the Saints.
 The Autonomous Orthodox Metropolia of Western Europe and the Americas. St. Hilarion Calendar of Saints for the year of our Lord 2004. St. Hilarion Press (Austin, TX). p. 30.
 April 21. Latin Saints of the Orthodox Patriarchate of Rome.
 The Roman Martyrology. Transl. by the Archbishop of Baltimore. Last Edition, According to the Copy Printed at Rome in 1914. Revised Edition, with the Imprimatur of His Eminence Cardinal Gibbons. Baltimore: John Murphy Company, 1916. pp. 111-112.
 Rev. Richard Stanton. A Menology of England and Wales, or, Brief Memorials of the Ancient British and English Saints Arranged According to the Calendar, Together with the Martyrs of the 16th and 17th Centuries. London: Burns & Oates, 1892. pp. 173-176.
Greek Sources
 Great Synaxaristes:  21 Απριλίου. Μεγασ Συναξαριστησ.
  Συναξαριστής. 21 Απριλίου. ecclesia.gr. (H Εκκλησια Τησ Ελλαδοσ). 
Russian Sources
  4 мая (21 апреля). Православная Энциклопедия под редакцией Патриарха Московского и всея Руси Кирилла (электронная версия). (Orthodox Encyclopedia - Pravenc.ru).
  21 апреля (ст.ст.) 4 мая 2013 (нов. ст.) . Русская Православная Церковь Отдел внешних церковных связей.

April in the Eastern Orthodox calendar